Education in Uttarakhand is provided by various public and private institutions. Uttarakhand had a long tradition of learning and culture.

Detail

In Uttarakhand there are 15,331 primary schools with 1,040,139 students and 22,118 working teachers (Year 2011). As per 2011 Census of India, the literacy rate of the state was 78.82% with 87.40% literacy for males and 70.01% literacy for females. The language of instruction in the schools is either English or Hindi.

There are mainly government and private schools and institutions including primary schools, high schools, inter college, degree colleges and technical institutions.
The main school affiliations are CBSE, CISCE or the State Government syllabus defined by the Department of Education of the Government of Uttarakhand.

Notable schools and Institutions
There are many notable schools and institutions in Uttarakhand.

 The Doon School Dehradun
 Sherwood College, Nainital
 The Woodstock School Mussoorie
 Oak Grove School (Mussoorie, Uttarakhand), Mussoorie
 St George's College, Mussoorie 
 Colonel Brown Cambridge School Dehradun 
 Convent of Jesus and Mary, Waverley, Mussoorie
 Wynberg Allen School, Mussoorie
 St Joseph's College, Nainital
 Birla Vidya Mandir, Nainital
 Welham Girls' School, Dehradun
 Welham Boys' School, Dehradun
 St Joseph's Academy, Dehradun
 Sainik School, Ghorakhal
 Lal Bahadur Shastri National Academy of Administration, Mussoorie
 Forest Research Institute, Dehradun 
 Indira Gandhi National Forest Academy (IGNFA), Dehradun 
 Wildlife Institute of India Dehradun 
 Indian Military Academy, Dehradun

Higher education

Schools

References